2018 Georgian Super Cup was a Georgian football match that was played on 24 February 2018 between the champions of 2017 Erovnuli Liga, Torpedo Kutaisi, and the winner of the 2017 Georgian Cup, Chikhura Sachkhere.

Match details

See also
2017 Erovnuli Liga
2017 Georgian Cup

References

2018
FC Torpedo Kutaisi
Supercup
February 2018 sports events in Europe